Violella wangii is a widespread, but seldom-collected species of crustose lichen in the family Tephromelataceae. Found in mountainous areas of Bhutan, China, India and the Russian Far East, it was formally described as a new species in 2011 by lichenologists Toby Spribille and Bernard Goffinet. In the Russian Far East, it has been recorded growing on the wood of Pinus pumila. Thin-layer chromatography of collected specimens showed the presence of three lichen products: atranorin, roccellic acid, and angardianic acid. The species epithet wangii honours Dr. Wang Li-Song, "for his ongoing efforts to describe the lichen diversity in western China".

References

Lecanorales
Lichen species
Lichens described in 2011
Lichens of China
Lichens of the Indian subcontinent
Lichens of the Russian Far East
Taxa named by Toby Spribille